Myrmecina graminicola is a species of ant found throughout Northern Africa, Europe, Asia, and elsewhere in the Palearctic realm. Its colonies build nests in soil, under rocks, and in leaf litter. It was described in 1802 by Pierre André Latreille, initially in the genus Formica. They are not an aggressive species. When a worker encounters an intruder, it starts to play dead with its legs and antennae folded. They live in colonies that have less than 100 workers and one queen. Before mating, the female ant releases a pheromone that the male ant is attracted to this and the mating then occurs seconds after. The ant colonies move around following the queen's pheromone trail.

References 

Insects described in 1802
Myrmicinae